p24 is a component of the HIV particle capsid. There are approximately 2000 molecules per virus particle, or at a molecule weight of 24 kDa, about 104 virus particles per picogram of p24. The onset of symptoms of AIDS correlates with a reduction in the number of CD4+ T cells and increased levels of virus and p24 in the blood. It is a component of the gag polyprotein.

Fourth-generation HIV test
Fourth-generation HIV immunoassays detect viral p24 protein in the blood (as well as patient antibodies against the virus). Previous generation tests relied on detecting patient antibodies alone; it takes about 3–4 weeks for the earliest antibodies to be detected. The p24 protein can be detected in patient blood as early as 2 weeks after HIV infection, further reducing the window period necessary to accurately detect the HIV status of the patient.

See also
HIV vaccine

References
 http://tronolab.epfl.ch/webdav/site/tronolab/shared/protocols/TUvsp24.html
 http://capitolregiontelehealth.org/documents/AETC-Webinar-2.pdf

Viral structural proteins
HIV/AIDS

fr:Virus de l'immunodéficience humaine#Structure